Pahanga diyaluma, is a species of spider of the genus Pahanga. It is endemic to Sri Lanka. It was first described from Diyaluma Falls area, hence the specific name.

See also
 List of Tetrablemmidae species

References

Tetrablemmidae
Endemic fauna of Sri Lanka
Spiders of Asia
Spiders described in 1981